Saint-Patrice is the name of several places:

Canada
 Saint-Patrice-de-Beaurivage, a municipality in Quebec
 Saint-Patrice-de-Sherrington, a parish in Quebec

France
 Saint-Patrice, a commune in Indre-et-Loire département